Bradley Lynch (born 8 December 1997) is a South African cricketer. He made his first-class debut on 17 October 2019, for North West in the 2019–20 CSA 3-Day Provincial Cup. He made his List A debut on 20 October 2019, for North West in the 2019–20 CSA Provincial One-Day Challenge.

References

External links
 

1997 births
Living people
South African cricketers
North West cricketers
Place of birth missing (living people)